The Aiful Cup was a professional golf tournament held in Japan from 1998 to 2006. It was an event on the Japan Golf Tour and was played at a variety of courses throughout Japan. The final event in 2006 was titled The Golf Tournament in Omaezaki with a purse of ¥120,000,000, with ¥24,000,000 going to the winner.

Tournament hosts

Winners

Source:

References

External links
Coverage on Japan Golf Tour's official site

Former Japan Golf Tour events
Defunct golf tournaments in Japan
Recurring sporting events established in 1998
Recurring sporting events disestablished in 2006